Lopheliella is a genus of sea snails, marine gastropod mollusks in the family Skeneidae.

Species
Species within the genus Lopheliella include:
 Lopheliella hermesae Hoffman, van Heugten & Lavaleye, 2008
 Lopheliella moolenbeeki Hoffman, van Heugten & Lavaleye, 2008
 Lopheliella moundforceae Hoffman, van Heugten & Lavaleye, 2008
 Lopheliella rockallensis Hoffman, van Heugten & Lavaleye, 2008

References

 Hoffman L., Van Heugten B., and Lavaleye M. S. S. (2008) "A new genus with four new species in the family Skeneidae (Gastropoda) from the Rockall Bank, northeastern Atlantic Ocean". Miscellanea Malacologica 3: pp. 39–48

 
Skeneidae
Gastropod genera